The Man from Texas is a 1915 American Western film, directed by and starring Tom Mix. The film was considered to be lost, but has been found and digitally remastered. It was shot near Prescott, Arizona by William Selig of the Selig Polyscope Company.

Cast
 Tom Mix as Texas
 Ed Brady (uncredited)
 Goldie Colwell (uncredited)
 Bessie Eyton as Moya Dalton (uncredited)
 Hoot Gibson as Deputy (uncredited)
 Sid Jordan as John Hargrave (uncredited)
 Louella Maxam (uncredited)

See also
 Hoot Gibson filmography
 Tom Mix filmography

References

External links
 

1915 films
1915 Western (genre) films
1915 short films
American silent short films
American black-and-white films
Selig Polyscope Company films
Silent American Western (genre) films
1910s American films